The Southern eagle ray (Myliobatis goodei), sometimes known as the Southern eagle fish or the rockfish, is a ray species in the family Myliobatidae. It lives in waters just off of the Atlantic coast, from the tip of Florida down to Argentina, inhabiting estuaries or bays to give birth during spring and summer and migrating to the open sea in autumn and winter. It has an average width of 99 centimeters, and a length of 60 centimeters. It is often confused with the bullnose ray, a related species in the genus Myliobatis, due to the two species' similarities in appearance.

Taxonomy 
Samuel Garman described the southern eagle ray in 1885.

Distribution and habitat 

The Southern eagle ray lives on various parts of the Atlanta coast. Sightings have been reported from the coast of Southern Mexico all the way down to Argentina, as well as on the coast of Florida. The specific countries that the Southern eagle ray is native to are Argentina, Belize, Brazil, Colombia, Costa Rica, French Guiana, Guyana, Honduras, Mexico, Nicaragua, Panama, Suriname, United States, Uruguay, and Venezuela. A sighting was also reported in the island of Maldives in August 2012, and then three more were reported in Australia.

The Southern eagle ray lives in shallow waters, mostly under 100 meters, but it can live in depths of up to 200. This is a significant contrast from the bullnose ray, which most commonly lives in depths of no more than 10 meters. It is benthopelagic, feeding in and inhabiting the areas just above the ocean floor, typically in brackish water. It prefers waters with a soft seabed, composed of elements such as mud, sand, or sea grass.

Description 

It does not have spines on its disc. The Southern eagle ray usually has a dark brown colored upper side, while most of its underside is a light shade of brown or white, with the outer edges often being darker.

Comparison with the bullnose ray 

The Southern eagle ray's appearance is similar to that of the bullnose ray, causing the two to often be confused. The following table shows the similarities and differences between the two related species:

Behavior 

The Southern eagle ray is a carnivore, mostly feeding on small invertebrates, such as shrimp, crabs, and gastropods.

The Southern eagle ray migrates seasonally. Adults inhabit the open sea during the autumn and winter, and return to their home location, which is usually an estuary or a bay, in the spring and summer, to give birth. The young that are born in summer usually wait until the end of the next summer before they migrate into the open waters, while those who are born in spring do this after the first summer passes. They then return to their home location again in the spring and summer, to give birth themselves. Little else is known about the ecology and reproduction of the Southern eagle ray.

Reproduction 

The Southern eagle ray exhibits ovoviviparity, meaning that the eggs remain inside the mother's body until they are ready to hatch. Embryos feed on yolk when they are first developed. As they develop further, they start receiving nourishment by absorbing uterine fluid from their mother instead.

Population, conservation, and status 

The Southern eagle ray is a rather common species, much more abundant than the bullnose ray. The species is caught by fisheries, sometimes intentionally but often as a bycatch. IUCN currently lists it as vulnerable. There are currently no conservation measures in place for this species.

The Southern eagle ray is often caught intentionally in fishing nets by artisanal fisheries. It is also quite often a bycatch component for trawl fisheries, especially in Caribbean South America and parts of Brazil. It is thought that this may eventually lead to its population declining in certain regions. It is also commonly caught in Venezuela, most often as a bycatch component. The number of reported catches of this species in Venezuela has increased greatly over the years, particularly throughout the 1980s and 1990s. The Southern eagle ray is also a common bycatch of various fisheries in southern Brazil, due to intensive fishing activities. Other batoids are commonly caught in this area as well. Although the intensive fishing has caused a significant decline in many batoid species, it is unknown how this affects eagle rays.

Parasites 

The Southern eagle ray has several parasites that infect it.
 Aberrapex arrhynchum
 Aberrapex ludmilae
 Aberrapex sanmartini
 Acanthobothrium sp.
 Caulobothrium ostrowskiae
 Caulobothrium uruguayensis
 Halysioncum megacanthum
 Mecistobothrium oblongum
 Parachristianella damiani
 Phyllobothrium myliobatidis

References 

Myliobatis
Taxa named by Samuel Garman
Fish of the Western Atlantic
Fish of the Indian Ocean
Fish described in 1885